Prodigal Sista is the second studio album by British R&B singer-songwriter Beverley Knight. It was released by Parlophone on 17 August 1998 in the United Kingdom. The album was the first to be released by Knight under her new contract with label, with whom she had signed a four album deal with in 1997 after leaving her previous label, Dome Records. The lyrics on the album were written entirely by Knight (with the exception of "Sista Sista" which was co-written with Hawk Wolinski), as was the creation of melodies and vocal arrangements.

Reception

The critical acclaim of the album proved to be widespread, with Q magazine calling the album "a triumph not only of Knight’s musical vision but also of the strength in her character" and The Times remarking "Prodigal Sista is a joy to hear – her vocal and intricate self devised and performed harmonies can make you catch your breath in wonderment". The success of the album was solidified at the 1999 MOBO Awards in London where Knight was named Best R&B Act and Prodigal Sista beat off competition from FanMail (TLC) and The Miseducation of Lauryn Hill (Lauryn Hill) to be named Best Album.

Chart performance
The success of the album proved to be much greater than her debut, The B-Funk, which peaked at #145 in Britain. Prodigal Sista peaked at #42 and was awarded a Gold Disk by the BPI for sales of over 100,000 in Britain.

Track listing

Charts

Certifications

References

Beverley Knight albums
1998 albums
Parlophone albums